Bailey Brown (June 16, 1917 – October 6, 2004) was a United States circuit judge of the United States Court of Appeals for the Sixth Circuit and prior to that was a United States district judge of the United States District Court for the Western District of Tennessee.

Education and career

Born in Memphis, Tennessee, Brown received an Artium Baccalaureus degree from the University of Michigan in 1939, and a Bachelor of Laws from Harvard Law School in 1942. He was a lieutenant in the United States Navy during World War II, from 1942 to 1946. He was in private practice in Memphis from 1946 to 1961.

Federal judicial service

Brown was nominated by President John F. Kennedy on August 7, 1961, to the United States District Court for the Western District of Tennessee, to a new seat authorized by 75 Stat. 80. He was confirmed by the United States Senate on August 21, 1961, and received his commission on August 21, 1961. He served as Chief Judge from 1966 to 1979. His service terminated on September 26, 1979, due to elevation to the Sixth Circuit.

Brown was nominated by President Jimmy Carter on March 15, 1979, to a seat on the United States Court of Appeals for the Sixth Circuit vacated by Judge Harry Phillips. He was confirmed by the Senate on September 25, 1979, and received his commission on September 26, 1979. He assumed senior status on June 16, 1982. His service terminated on December 31, 1997, due to retirement.

Death

Brown died on October 6, 2004, in Memphis.

References

Sources
 

1917 births
2004 deaths
People from Memphis, Tennessee
Military personnel from Tennessee
Judges of the United States District Court for the Western District of Tennessee
United States district court judges appointed by John F. Kennedy
Judges of the United States Court of Appeals for the Sixth Circuit
United States court of appeals judges appointed by Jimmy Carter
20th-century American judges
University of Michigan alumni
Harvard Law School alumni
United States Navy officers
United States Navy personnel of World War II